In 125 BCE, the Latin town of Fregellae revolted against Rome demanding Roman citizenship. The Romans reacted by sending the praetor Lucius Opimius with an army to suppress the rebellion. A local traitor named Numitorius opened the gates to the Roman army; Opimius razed the town. A year later Fabrateria Nova was founded near the site of the destroyed town.

See also
List of Roman civil wars and revolts

References 

Revolts
125 BC
120s BC conflicts
History of Lazio